In economics, colonial goods are goods imported from European colonies, in particular coffee, tea, spices, rice, sugar, cocoa and chocolate, and tobacco.

At a time when food and agriculture represented a relatively large proportion of overall economic activity, economic statistics often divided traded goods between "colonial goods", "domestic (agricultural and extractive sectors) production" and "manufactured (secondary sector) production".

The term "colonial goods" became less appropriate with the collapse of the western European empires that followed the Second World War.   It nevertheless still appeared in books and articles in the 1970s, by now covering not merely agricultural output from (formerly) colonial countries but all long-life staple foods, regardless of provenance, as well as soap, washing powder and petrol/gasoline, and other newly important basic household supplies.

Colonial goods stores

Colonial goods stores were retailers specializing in colonial goods. The name is now used generically for grocery stores selling non-perishable items.

Notes

History of international trade
Late modern economic history
Goods